Wilhelm Ludwig Nikolai Bockslaff (Riga – 9 March 1945, Poznań) was a Baltic German architect working in Riga. He is considered one of the most important representatives of Eclecticism, Neo-Gothic and Art Nouveau styles in the city. He is noted in particular for his construction of churches.

Biography 
Wilhelm Bockslaff was born in Riga on 12 October 1858. His father was the wealthy merchant and industrialist Nicholas Ludwig Bockslaff.
In 1878 he started architecture studies in Riga Polytechnicum and graduated in 1885. After graduation, he stayed in the polytechnikum to work as an assistant. He also worked in the offices of architects Johann Koch and Heinrich Scheel. Later he established his own architects office. In this period he studied the history of St. Peter's church in Riga and other medieval buildings in the city.
In 1894 he married Eva Riker.

Bockslaff worked mainly in eclectic styles, especially in the Neo-Gothic style. However, he also designed buildings in forms of Art Nouveau. Most notable buildings are Jaunmokas Manor near Tukums and the Commercial school in Riga (Now Art Academy of Latvia). The architect also restored many manors after the Revolution of 1905.
He also has designed a large number of churches and various industrial objects such as factories and water towers.

In the 1930s he designed an impressive memorial for him and his wife in Riga Great Cemetery. However, only his wife was buried there in 1939. He himself was forced to leave Latvia together with a majority of Baltic Germans and settled in Posen.
He died on 9 March 1945 in the bombing of Posen. His daughter buried him in the garden of their residence. After the war he was anonymously reburied in a local cemetery.

In honor of the architect's 150th birthday, a monument was erected in the park of Mālpils Manor.

See also
Dzelzava Manor
Jaunmokas Manor
Jaunpils Castle
Lielstraupe Castle
Mālpils Manor
Taurupe Manor
Vecbebri Manor
List of Baltic German architects

References

This article was initially translated from the German Wikipedia.

1858 births
1945 deaths
Architects from Riga
Baltic-German people
Art Nouveau architects
Riga Technical University alumni
Academic staff of Riga Technical University